Trochoidea spratti  is a species of air-breathing land snail, a terrestrial pulmonate gastropod mollusk in the family Geomitridae, the hairy snails and their allies. 

Subspecies
 Trochoidea spratti calcarata (Benoit, 1860)
 Trochoidea spratti spratti (L. Pfeiffer, 1846)

Distribution

This species is endemic to Malta.

References

 Bank, R. A.; Neubert, E. (2017). Checklist of the land and freshwater Gastropoda of Europe. Last update: July 16th, 2017

External links
 Malta's unique land snails
 Pfeiffer, L. (1846). Symbolae ad historiam Heliceorum. Sectio tertia. 1–100. Cassellis: Th. Fischer
 Pfeiffer L. (1847-1848). Monographia Heliceorum viventium. Sistens descriptiones systematicas et criticas omnium huius familiae generum et specierum hodie cognitarum. Volumen primum. (1): 1–160
 Benoit, C. L. (1857-1862). Illustrazione sistematica critica iconografica de'testacei estramarini della Sicilia ulteriore e delle isole circostanti. I-XVI, 1-248, Tav. I-IX, XI-XII

Trochoidea (genus)
Gastropods described in 1846